Sudbury & Harrow Road is a National Rail station served by Chiltern Railways in Harrow Road, Sudbury in Greater London. It was the least used railway station in Greater London until 2015/16 and is 400m north of Sudbury Town Underground station.

History

On 20 November 1905 the Great Central Railway opened a new route for freight trains between Neasden Junction and Northolt Junction. Passenger services from Marylebone began on 1 March 1906, when three new stations were opened: Wembley Hill, Sudbury & Harrow Road and South Harrow. On 2 April 1906 these services were extended to Northolt Junction. 

The film 'Mosque in the Park' made for Thames Television and first shown 5 June 1973 (directed and narrated by acclaimed film Director Yavar Abbas), featured the daily routine of leading railwayman Mr. Siddiq who was originally from Delhi and who moved to London in 1960. The film shows him at work for British Rail at the Sudbury & Harrow Road railway station, a job that he did alone.

Services
The station is served by a limited service of just 4 trains per day in each direction during the peak hours Monday-Friday only.

There are no services on Saturdays or Sundays.

Connections
London Buses routes 18, 92, 182 and 245 and night route N18 serve the station.
Sudbury Town Underground station is a 5-minute walk away for London Underground services.

References

External links

Spider bus map for transport links from Transport in London

Railway stations in the London Borough of Brent
Former Great Central Railway stations
Railway stations in Great Britain opened in 1906
Railway stations served by Chiltern Railways